Jean-Michel Richeux (born 9 November 1948) is a French former cyclist. He competed in the team time trial event at the 1976 Summer Olympics.

References

External links
 

1948 births
Living people
French male cyclists
Olympic cyclists of France
Cyclists at the 1976 Summer Olympics
Place of birth missing (living people)